Gorgoleptis emarginatus is a species of sea snail, a marine gastropod mollusk in the family Lepetodrilidae.

References

Lepetodrilidae
Gastropods described in 1988